Plasmodium melanipherum is a parasite of the genus Plasmodium subgenus Vinckeia. As in all Plasmodium species, P. melanipherum has both vertebrate and insect hosts. The vertebrate hosts for this parasite are mammals.

Taxonomy 
This species was first described by Dionisi in 1899. A subspecies (P. melanipherum monosoma) was later described by Vassal in 1907. P. melanipherum was described to resemble Plasmodium malariae.

Distribution 
P. melanipherum has only been described in Central Africa.

Hosts 
P. melanipherum infects Schreibers' bat (Miniopterus schreibersii). P. melanipherum monosoma infects the bat Vesperugo abramus. It is not known if these parasites cause disease in their bat hosts.

References 

melanipherum